"Don't Worry" is a song by the Norwegian urban duo Madcon featuring vocals from American singer and songwriter Ray Dalton. It was written by Teddy Sky, Johnny Powers Severin and Madcon and was released in Norway as a digital download on 20 February 2015. The song peaked at number 4 on the Norwegian Singles Chart and reached the Top 10 in several countries.

Music video
A music video to accompany the release of "Don't Worry" was first released onto YouTube on 18 April 2015 at a total length of four minutes and six seconds.

An extraterrestrial (named Mr. Smiley) plummets to Earth and suffers a bad landing on a car. His tablet computer tells him that he is on Earth, and we are "Population: Bored". The mission of the alien: "Activate Madsmile". Markus Bailey was cast as Mr. Smiley a man from outer space wearing golden shoes and shedding joyful light.

Track listing

Charts

Weekly charts

Year-end charts

Certifications

Release history

References

2015 songs
2015 singles
Madcon songs
Songs written by Geraldo Sandell
Songs written by Ray Dalton